HMS Calliope was a Cherokee-class brig-sloop of the Royal Navy, launched in 1808. She operated primarily in the North Sea where she captured numerous small merchant vessels and one French privateer. She also was present at the battle of Lake Borgne, near New Orleans. She was broken up in 1829.

Napoleonic Wars
Calliope was commissioned in September 1808 under Commander John M'Kerlie.

In August–September 1809 Calliope took part in the ill-fated Walcheren Campaign. In particular, she was at the capture of Flushing on 15 August.

That evening the two vessels were off Flushing when a heavy gale and snowstorm parted them. Pigeon grounded and was lost, though almost her entire crew survived.

Admiral Sir Richard Strachan then assigned Calliope to patrol off the north coast of Holland to Heligoland.

Calliope and  shared in the proceeds of the capture on 7 March 1810 of the Danish vessels Aggershuns and Anna Mette Catharina.

On 13 March  Calliope captured the Danish vessels Ellen Sophia, Wagrein, and Hoffnung, and on 12 April Sprinkhorn, and Oppreissring.

Calliope and  shared in the proceeds of the capture on 2 September of the Danish vessels Goede   Verwagting and Frou Esje.

On 25 October 1810 Calliope was at  when she sighted an enemy vessel sailing towards her. The approaching enemy had apparently mistaken Calliope for a merchant brig; at the enemy came up to about three miles away, she realized her mistake, at which point M'Kerlie gave chase. Eventually Calliope caught up with her quarry and succeeded in bringing down her mainmast; with the loss of rigging and sails the quarry had to strike. The enemy vessel was the schooner Comtesse d'Hambourg, of eight 12-pounder carronades, six 8-pounder guns, and 51 men. She was seven days out of Dunkirk, but had not captured anything. M'Kerlie reported that Calliope had had three men wounded. Comtesse d'Hambourg had no casualties; her crew had fired her guns and then taken refuge below decks.

On 12 March 1811 Calliope captured the Danish brig Silenus.

On 9 September Callioppe captured the Dutch dogger Morgenstar.

On 10 July 1813 Calliope was part of a squadron that captured eight small vessels in the Elbe and Weser.

The shared in the proceeds of the capture on that day of Frou Magaretha.

Also on 27 October Calliope and Brevdrageren captured the Danish sloop Einzigheit.

Between 10 July and 31 December 1813 the squadron of which Calliope was a part succeeded in capturing 19 vessels.

Commander John Codd was appointed to Calliope on 6 December 1813, replacing M'Kerlie. Calliope remained on the North Sea station.

Under the rules of prize-money, she shared in the proceeds of the capture of the American vessels in the Battle of Lake Borgne on 14 December 1814.

In April 1815 Commander Henry Thompson replaced Codd. Then in September 1815 Commander Alexander Maconochie replaced Thompson, but Calliope was laid up that month.

Post-war
Calliope underwent repairs at Portsmouth between July and December 1820. While captain of Calliope, he conveyed the Mexican chargé d’affaires, Senor Rocafuerte, with a treaty of commerce, from England to New Spain. The government of the republic rewarded Powney with a table service of plate. He brought home from thence a freight of considerable value, arriving back in England on 27 April 1827.

In spring 1827, Calliope was found unfit for further service. Lieutenant Powney was lent, with the crew of Royal George, to the Royal yacht . On 26 June 1827 Powney received a promotion to the rank of Commander.

Fate
Calliope was broken up at Portsmouth on 13 August 1829.

Notes

Citations

References
 
 
 
 
 
 

Cherokee-class brig-sloops
1808 ships
War of 1812 ships of the United Kingdom